Yugabharathi is a Tamil poet and lyricist. His birth name was "Santhanam Desan" and he was known as "Santhanam" by his family and friends. During the early 1990s when he began writing poems for magazines he started using the pen name "Yugabharathi" in honour of the great Tamil poet Subramanya Bharathi, commonly known as Mahakavi Bharithiyar.

Debuting in the film Aanandham with lyrics for the song "Pallankuzhiyin vattam parthaen", he has become a successful lyricist penning more than 1000 songs.

Education
Yugabharathi studied in Maxwell Matriculation Higher Secondary School (Thanjavur) and received his diploma in mechanical engineering at Government Polytechnic College (Aranthangi).

Notable works
Some of the more notable songs which Yugabharathi has written lyrics for are "Kadhal pisase" from Run, "Manmada Rasa" from Thiruda Thirudi, "sambo siva sambo" from Naadodigal, "Kannamma" from Rekka, and "Konja neram" from Chandramukhi, “Unna pola oruthana” from vertivel .

Filmography

Lyricist

2002-2009

2010-2015

2016 - 2021

2022 - present

Writer
 2016 Maaveeran Kittu

Television
 2005 Getti Melam
 2007 Madurai
 2007 Thirumathi Selvam
 2007 Megala
 2009 Thendral
 2009 Roja Kootam
 2009 Idhayam
 2011 Kana Kaanum Kaalangal Oru Kallooriyin Kadhai
 2011 Azhagi
 2011 Uthiri Pookal
 2011 Meera
 2011 Pirivom Santhippom
 2011 Thulasi
 2013 Deivamagal
 2013 Ponnunjal
 2013 Then Nilavu
 2013 Pasamalar
 2014 Maragatha Vennai
 2014 Sakthi
 2015 Priyamanaval
 2015 Aathira
 2015 Keladi Kanmani
 2015 Priyasaki
 2020 Abhiyum Naanum

Awards
Vijay Awards 
 Nominated: 2010 - Best Lyricist for - Mynaa
 Nominated: 2014 - Best Lyricist for - Cuckoo
South Indian International Movie Awards 
 Nominated: 2012 - Best Lyricist for "Sollitaley" - Kumki
 Nominated: 2014 - Best Lyricist for "Manasula Soorakathu" - Cuckoo
 Nominated: 2021 - Best Lyricist for "Ellu Vaya Pookalaye" - Asuran
 Nominated: 2022 - Best Lyricist for "Saare Kaathe" - Annaatthe

Filmfare Awards South
 Won: 2012 - Best Lyricist for "Sollitaley" - Kumki
 Nominated: 2014 - Best Lyricist for "Manasula Soorakathu" - Cuckoo

Tamil Nadu State Film Awards
 Won: 2017 - Tamil Nadu State Film Award for Best Lyricist for Pasanga

References

External links
 

Tamil film poets
People from Tamil Nadu
Living people
Indian lyricists
Year of birth missing (living people)